Paul Baines may refer to:

 Paul Baines (academic) (born 1973), British marketing academic
 Paul Baines (footballer) (born 1972), former English footballer